was a Japanese freestyle swimmer. She competed in the 1932 Summer Olympics.

In 1932 she was a member of the Japanese relay team which finished fifth in the 4 × 100 metre freestyle relay event. In the 100 metre freestyle competition she was eliminated in the first round.

External links
Profile

1914 births
Year of death missing
Olympic swimmers of Japan
Swimmers at the 1932 Summer Olympics
Japanese female freestyle swimmers